John Cromwell Mather (born August 7, 1946, Roanoke, Virginia) is an American astrophysicist, cosmologist and Nobel Prize in Physics laureate for his work on the Cosmic Background Explorer Satellite (COBE) with George Smoot.

This work helped cement the big-bang theory of the universe. According to the Nobel Prize committee, "the COBE-project can also be regarded as the starting point for cosmology as a precision science."

Mather is a senior astrophysicist at the NASA Goddard Space Flight Center (GSFC) in Maryland and adjunct professor of physics at the University of Maryland College of Computer, Mathematical, and Natural Sciences. In 2007, Time magazine listed Mather among the 100 Most Influential People in The World. In October 2012, he was listed again by Time magazine in a special issue on New Space Discoveries as one of the 25 most influential people in space.

Mather is one of the 20 American recipients of the Nobel Prize in Physics to sign a letter addressed to President George W. Bush in May 2008, urging him to "reverse the damage done to basic science research in the Fiscal Year 2008 Omnibus Appropriations Bill" by requesting additional emergency funding for the Department of Energy's Office of Science, the National Science Foundation, and the National Institute of Standards and Technology.

Mather is also the senior project scientist for the James Webb Space Telescope (JWST), a space telescope launched to Lagrange point L2 on December 25, 2021.

In 2014, Mather delivered an address on the James Webb Space Telescope at the second Starmus Festival in the Canary Islands.

Education and initial research

 1964 Newton High School, Newton, New Jersey
 1968 B.Sc. (Physics), Swarthmore College (Highest Honors)
 1974 Ph.D. (Physics), University of California, Berkeley
 1974-1976 (NRC Postdoctoral Fellow), Columbia University Goddard Institute for Space Studies

Honors and awards

 1964-1968  Swarthmore College Open Scholarship (honorary)
 1967 William Lowell Putnam Mathematical Competition, 30th place nationwide
 1968 Highest possible score (990), physics Grad Records
 1968-1970 NSF Fellowship and honorary Woodrow Wilson Fellowship
 1970-1974 Fellow, Hertz Foundation
 1974-1976 Postdoctoral Fellow, NRC
 1990 NASA GSFC John C. Lindsay Memorial Award
 1991 Rotary National Space Achievement Award
 1991 National Air and Space Museum Trophy
 1992 Aviation Week and Space Technology Laurels for Space/Missiles
 1993 Discover Magazine Technology Award finalist
 1993 American Institute of Aeronautics and Astronautics Space Science Award
 1993 American Astronomical Society and American Institute of Physics Dannie Heineman Prize for Astrophysics
 1994 Fellow, Goddard Space Flight Center
 1994 Doctor of Science, honoris causa, Swarthmore College
 1995 City of Philadelphia John Scott Award
 1996 American Academy of Arts and Sciences Rumford Prize
 1996 Fellow, American Physical Society
 1997 Aviation Week and Space Technology Hall of Fame
 1997 Member, National Academy of Sciences
 1998 Marc Aaronson Memorial Prize
 1998 Member, American Academy of Arts and Sciences
 1999 Franklin Institute Benjamin Franklin Medal in Physics
 2005 Society of Photo-Optical Instrumentation Engineers George W. Goddard Award
 2006 Peter and Patricia Gruber Foundation Prize in Cosmology
 2006 Nobel Prize in Physics
 2007 Fellow, SPIE - The International Society for Optical Engineering
 2007 American Academy of Achievement, Golden Plate Award 
 2008 Robinson Prize
 2008 Doctor of Science, honoris causa, University of Maryland
 2008, Commencement Speaker, University of Maryland Winter Commencement
 2010 India General President Gold Medal
 2010 Fellow of the Optical Society of America
 2011 Doctor of Science, honoris causa, University of Notre Dame
2020 Elected a Legacy Fellow of the American Astronomical Society.

Publications
 Mather, J. C.  "Far Infrared Spectrometry of the Cosmic Background Radiation", University of California Berkeley, Lawrence Berkeley National Laboratory, United States Department of Energy (through predecessor agency the Atomic Energy Commission), (Jan. 1974).
 Mather, J. C.; Albrecht, A.; et al.  "Report of the Dark Energy Task Force", Fermi National Accelerator Laboratory, United States Department of Energy, (2006).
 Mather, J. C.;Boslough, John; the very first light; 1996,2008 Basic Books

Appearances
Mather is the Science Director of the National Academy of Future Scientists and Technologists.

References

External links

 John C. Mather biography at the Goddard Space Flight Center
 Interview with John Mather from the SPIE Newsroom
 Berkeley lab article
 Mather's group's data that led to the Nobel Prize in symmetry magazine.
 John C. Mather on the Infancy of the Universe at the National Academy of Sciences
 John Mather Nobel Scholar Program
 AIP Mather Policy Internship Program
 John Mather Nobel Medal replica flown in Space Shuttle Atlantis
 Replica of John Mather Nobel Medal in National Air and Space Museum permanent collection
 
 John Mather Nobel banquet speech from 2006
 John Mather commencement address at the University of Maryland from 2008
 John Mather visits German Embassy
 John Mather in White House
 John Mather Nobel Scholarship has new host
 University of Maryland names John Mather College Park Professor
 Daniel Chalonge Medal 2011 awarded to John Mather
 National Geographic showcases John Mather
 John Mather elected Fellow of AAAS
John Mather's 2021 Talk in the Silicon Valley Astronomy Lecture Series on 'How the Smooth Early Universe Grew into Everyone You Know'
 American Astronomical Society hosts John Mather inspiring students
 John Mather on Cosmic Complexity
 John Mather 2012 delegate at the Blouin Creative Leadership Summit
 John Mather in dialogue at Lindau Nobel
 
 Smithsonian presents John Mather
 John Mather receives the Power of Excellence Award "for his excellence in his career and becoming a positive role model."
 Southern Illinois University Shaw Lecture features John Mather
 2013 Albert Einstein World Award of Science Nomination
 
 John Mather Biography and Interview on American Academy of Achievement
  including the Nobel Lecture on 8 December 2006 From the Big Bang to the Nobel Prize and Beyond

1946 births
Living people
American astronomers
American Nobel laureates
21st-century American physicists
Fellows of the American Physical Society
Goddard Space Flight Center
NASA people
NASA astrophysicists
Nobel laureates in Physics
People from Sussex County, New Jersey
People from Roanoke, Virginia
Swarthmore College alumni
University of California, Berkeley alumni
University of Maryland, College Park faculty
Columbia University faculty
Fellows of Optica (society)
Honorary members of Optica (society)
Members of the United States National Academy of Sciences
Winners of the Dannie Heineman Prize for Astrophysics
Scientists from Virginia
Fellows of the American Astronomical Society